The Singapore Art Museum (Abbreviation: SAM) is an art museum is located in the Downtown Core district of Singapore. It is the first fully dedicated contemporary visual arts museum in Singapore with one of the world’s most important public collections by local, Southeast and East Asian artists. It collaborates with international art museums to co-curate contemporary art exhibitions.

SAM presents art across multiple spaces such as Tanjong Pagar Distripark, its heritage buildings and other partner venues across Singapore. The heritage buildings are located at two adjacent sites. The main building, dating back to 1955 is the former Saint Joseph’s Institution on Bras Basah Road; the second building known as the 'SAM at 8Q' was the former Catholic High School on Queen Street. The museum organised the Singapore Biennale in 2011, 2013, 2016, 2019 and will continue to do so in 2022.

History 
Officially opened on 20 January 1996, SAM is one of the first art museums with international-standard museum facilities and programmes in Southeast Asia.

The museum, then known as a fine art museum, was born out of a project by the National Museum to set up a five-museum precinct in the city. The other four museums that make up the precinct are known as the Singapore History Museum, Asian Civilisations Museum, People's Museum and the Children's Museum. The Fine Arts Museum project began with the restoration of the former St. Joseph's Institution building. At the same time, the appointment of artist and surgeon Earl Lu to head an 11-member Fine Arts Museum Board was announced on 18 July 1992, by the Minister of State (Information and the Arts and Education), Ker Sin Tze. The museum board was tasked to acquire works of art by notable painters from Southeast Asia and East Asia, and by upcoming artists from these regions. Low Chuck Tiew, a retired banker and prominent art collector, served as museum adviser, along with Shirley Loo-Lim, Deputy Director of the National Museum of Singapore as vice-chairman of the board. Geh Min, Ho Kok Hoe, Lee Seng Tee, Arthur Lim, T.K. Sabapathy, Sarkasi Said, Sum Yoke Kit, Wee Chwee Heng, Singapore Polytechnic alumni, and Yap-Whang Whee Yong formed the rest of the museum board.
The restoration work on the then 140-year-old national monument took more than two years at a cost of S$30 million. It first opened its doors to the public as the Singapore Art Museum on 20 October 1995. Its first art installation was a S$90,000, -high Swarovski crystal chandelier at the museum main entrance. It weighs 325 kilograms and took over three months to make. The museum was officially opened by the Prime Minister of Singapore, Goh Chok Tong on 20 January 1996. In his opening speech he envisioned the new museum, along with the other four museums in the Arts and Heritage District and the Arts Centre, aiding Singapore in reprising its historic role as a centre of entrepot trade for the arts, culture, civilisation and ideas to the people in the Asian region and the rest of the world.

In 2019, the museum closed for a second redevelopment that will preserve the heritage buildings’ architecture. The redevelopment will be completed in 2026.

In January 2022, SAM opened a new contemporary art space at Tanjong Pagar Distripark. Spread across two floors, SAM at Tanjong Pagar Distripark houses two galleries, an F&B space and residency studios. Museum exhibitions and events continue at partner venues and community spaces.

Location and amenities 
SAM at Tanjong Pagar Distripark is located in a historic port district, alongside other gallery and exhibition spaces such as Gajah Gallery and ArtSpace@Helutrans. It is of walking proximity to Chinatown, Duxton and Everton Park and accessible by public buses, MRT and cab services.  

SAM’s heritage buildings are situated in the heart of Singapore's arts and culture district, located alongside Singapore's major performing arts and visual arts institutions: the Nanyang Academy of Fine Arts, LASALLE College of the Arts, the Stamford Arts Centre, the Selegie Arts Centre, Singapore Calligraphy Centre, YMS Arts Centre, Dance Ensemble Singapore, Action Theatre and School of the Arts.

In addition to the main museum building, SAM maintains an annexe on 8 Queen Street, SAM at 8Q, which also exhibits SAM's collection of contemporary art, as well as newly-commissioned, contemporary artworks. The two buildings are currently closed for redevelopment.

Collection and exhibitions 
SAM's approach is to present works curated from the National Collection alongside changing exhibitions, to offer a well-rounded aesthetic experience of Asian contemporary art. From 2001, the museum began acquiring works and accepting donations from around the region, including regional contemporary artists like Cheo Chai-Hiang, Dinh Q. Lê, Natee Utarit, Nge Lay, Suzann Victor and Titarubi.

The museum also regularly partners with other leading art institutions to co-curate and produce exhibitions, such as the collaboration with the Yokohama Museum of Art for Still Moving: A Triple Bill on the Image; Museum of Contemporary Art Tokyo for Trans-Cool TOKYO (highlighting works by Japanese artists such as Yayoi Kusama and Yasumasa Morimura); Video, An Art, A History with the Pompidou Center (Bill Viola, Jean-Luc Godard, Bruce Nauman); and They Do Not Understand Each Other with Tai Kwun and National Museum of Art, Osaka.

The museum organises regular contemporary art exhibitions and events. For example, French artist Stéphane Blanquet was invited, twice, to present installations. Once, for the Night Lights festival in 2012, with Distorted Forest and once for Art Gardens in 2013, with Glossy Dreams in Depth. French artist Emmanuel Guillaud presented an in-situ version of his installation Until the sun rises in 2011.  

Since 2010, SAM started to focus on contemporary art practices from Southeast Asia. More recently, the museum presented Time Passes in 2020, an exhibition which showcased the works of 13 emerging Singaporean artists, and The Gift in 2021, an exhibition which featured artists from the region such as Dolorosa Sinaga, Ho Tzu Nyen, Korakrit Arunanondchai, Salleh Japar and Tang Da Wu, among others.

Censorship
In 2008, SAM hosted ARX 5 (Artists’ Regional Exchange) where Hong Kong artist and caricaturist Zunzi's work, Lee's Garden, was removed from the museum's walls by its staff. The work consisted of a caricature of Prime Minister Goh Chok Tong wielding pest-control gear, with the senior minister and former prime minister Lee Kuan Yew patting him on the back. This censorship was committed without any consultation with or notification of the artist, and sparked off a diplomatic and media incident.

In late 2011, following a private preview, SAM removed Japanese-British artist Simon Fujiwara’s work, Welcome to the Hotel Munber. The piece, which was part of an exhibition organised by the National Arts Council in 2010, featured homoerotic content. Despite advisory notices put up by the museum and the Singapore Biennale, the work was taken down without any consultation with or notification of the artist after pressure by conservative groups.

See also 
 National Gallery Singapore

Literature 
 Singapore Biennale 2013: If the World Changed, 
 Tomorrow, Today: Contemporary Art from the Singapore Art Museum (2009–2011), 
 Are You Afraid of Contemporary Art? by Vincent Leow,

References

External links 

 Official Website
 Singapore Art Museum at Google Cultural Institute

Art museums established in 1996
National museums of Singapore
Art museums and galleries in Singapore
Asian art museums in Singapore
Modern art museums
Contemporary art galleries in Asia
1996 establishments in Singapore